The Henderson Police Department (HPD) is the police department of the City of Henderson in Clark County in southern Nevada. The department is accredited through the Commission on Accreditation for Law Enforcement Agencies (CALEA). It has 391 sworn police officers, along with support staff.

History
The City of Henderson Police Department began in 1953 with just seven officers and a borrowed car from the Clark County Sheriff's Department to patrol the city.

Organization
The police chief is assisted by two deputy chiefs and five officers in the rank of captain. There is also a senior officer designated as corrections superintendent. 
One deputy chief heads the Operations Command, the other the Support Command. Each command has a number of divisions, all (except the Corrections Division) headed by a captain. 
Operations Command has East, West and North Patrol Divisions. 
Support Command has Investigative Service Division, Special Services Division, Technical Services Division and Corrections Division.

 East Police Station  
 North Police Station 
 West Police Station

Misconduct
Press reports indicate that on the night of October 29, 2010, Henderson police Sergeant Brett Seekatz repeatedly kicked a motorist named Adam Greene in the head. Although the District Attorney Steve Wolfson declined to prosecute Seekatz, the incident lead to a payment of almost $300,000 to Greene and the forced resignation of Police Chief Jutta Chambers. Sergeant Seekatz is still with the department.

On January 14, 2013, the Las Vegas Review-Journal reported that a Federal grand jury was reviewing the case of officer Brett Seekatz. Seekatz, who jointed the police department in 2002, was promoted to lieutenant in 2016.

Anthony Mitchell claims in a lawsuit that on July 10, 2011, he was at home, when officers called his home and said they needed to occupy the house in order to gain a "tactical advantage" in dealing with a domestic violence case at a neighbor's home. Mitchell told the police that he did not want them entering his home. Officers showed up later and broke down the door anyway. Anthony and his father, Michael Mitchell, were arrested and charged with obstructing an officer and spent 9 hours in jail. Anthony's mother, Linda Mitchell, was forced from her and her husband's home as well, which is on the same street as Anthony's home.  The lawsuit alleges that officers are guilty of crimes including assault, battery and abuse of processes as well as violating constitutional amendments, notably, the suit alleges officers violated the Third Amendment to the US Constitution.

Rank structure

References

External links
 Official website

Government of Henderson, Nevada
Municipal police departments of Nevada
1953 establishments in Nevada
Organizations based in Henderson, Nevada